Simeon is a surname. Notable people with the surname include:

 Albert T. W. Simeons (1900–1970), leading exponent of a weight-loss protocol based on human chorionic gonadotropin (hCG)
 Arthur Simeon (born 1983), stand-up comedian based in Toronto, Canada
 Charles Simeon (1759–1836), English evangelical clergyman
 Charles Simeon (colonist) (1816–1867), one of the members of the Canterbury Association who emigrated to Canterbury, New Zealand
 Daphne Simeon, American psychiatrist
 David Simeon (born 1943), British actor
 Doris Simeon, award-winning Yoruba and English actress
 Eleazar b. Simeon, Jewish Tanna sage of the fifth generation
 Eric Simeon (1918–2007), Indian school educationalist
 George Simeon (fl. 1614–1624), English landowner and politician who sat in the House of Commons
 Jay Simeon (born 1976), Canadian artist of Haida heritage
 John Simeon (disambiguation)
 José Simeón (born 1991), Spanish basketball player
 Mbaydoum Simeon, member of the Pan-African Parliament from Chad
 Omer Simeon (1902–1959), American jazz clarinetist
 Richard Simeon, 2nd Baronet (1784–1854), English Liberal Party politician
 Silvano Simeon (1945–2010), Italian discus thrower
 Simeon baronets, two baronetcies created for persons with the surname Simeon
 Xavier Siméon (born 1989), Grand Prix motorcycle racer from Belgium

See also
 Joseph Balthasar, Comte Siméon
 Joseph Jérôme, Comte Siméon
 San Simeon (horse)
 Simeon (given name)
 Tribe of Simeon
Surnames from given names